Hermann Bruno Otto Blumenau (December 26, 1819 – October 30, 1899) was a German pharmacist who founded the city of Blumenau, situated in the Itajaí-Açu river valley in the state of Santa Catarina, Brazil.

Biography 

Hermann Bruno Otto Blumenau was a son of a forest administrator, born in Hasselfelde, Duchy of Brunswick (in present-day Saxony-Anhalt). Between 1832 and 1836 he attended the secondary school in Braunschweig, but left school to become a pharmacist. From 1840 to 1841 he worked in a pharmacy in Hasselfelde. He later worked in a pharmacy in Erfurt, where he met Alexander Humboldt and Justus von Liebig. Soon after, Blumenau visited London with the Consul-General of Brazil, Johann Jakob Sturz, and decided to emigrate.

He studied chemistry at the University of Erlangen from 1844 until 1846, when he received his doctorate. Between 1846 and 1848 he travelled  in southern Brazil for the Hamburg colonial society. He claimed about 200 km2 of forest in the province of Santa Catarina. After 2 years in Germany, he returned to Brazil in 1850 with 17 German colonists and established the colony Blumenau. After the Brazilian government took control of the growing village in 1860, he remained as the first official director.

Blumenau founded schools and hospitals in his growing city, and by 1880 its population totaled approximately 15,000 people, most of whom were Germans. This population has managed to preserve its German heritage and, even today, German schools still prevail.

In 1884, Blumenau returned to Braunschweig, Germany with his wife (whom he had married in 1867) and their three sons. He died on October 30, 1899 in Braunschweig.

References

External links
Origins of the Germans who emigrated to Brazil (in Portuguese)

1819 births
1899 deaths
People from Oberharz am Brocken
People from the Duchy of Brunswick
People from Blumenau
German Lutherans
German emigrants to Brazil
Blumenau
Brazilian city founders
19th-century Lutherans
German city founders